Mexico may refer to:

 Mexico, Juniata County, Pennsylvania
 Mexico, Montour County, Pennsylvania